Chung Jae-woong  (born 2 June 1999) is a South Korean speed skater who competes internationally.
 
He participated at the 2018 Winter Olympics, in men's 1000 metres.

References

External links

  

1999 births
Living people
South Korean male speed skaters
Olympic speed skaters of South Korea
Speed skaters at the 2018 Winter Olympics
Speed skaters at the 2016 Winter Youth Olympics
21st-century South Korean people
20th-century South Korean people